Hassan Bahara (born 1978 in Teroua n'Aït Izou, Morocco) is a Moroccan-Dutch writer. He grew up in Amsterdam. He won the "El Hizjra Prize for Literature" in both 2000 and 2001. Een verhaal uit de stad Damsko is his debut novel. Bahara is editor for the satirical literary weekly Propria Cures. Bahara is an atheist and critical of Islam.

References

External links
 Bahara's website, currently offline 

1978 births
Living people
Former Muslim critics of Islam
Dutch atheists
Dutch former Muslims
21st-century Dutch writers
Moroccan atheists
Moroccan former Muslims
Moroccan writers
Moroccan emigrants to the Netherlands
Dutch critics of Islam
Writers from Amsterdam
Former Muslims turned agnostics or atheists